The Cincinnati Milling Machine Company was an American machine tool builder headquartered in Cincinnati, Ohio. Incorporated in 1889, the company was formed for the purpose of building and promoting innovative new machine tool designs, especially milling machines.  The principals in forming the company were Frederick A. Geier and Fred Holz. It was formed from the Cincinnati Screw and Tap Co. A partnership of George Mueller and Fred Holz that became more successful building machine tools,

From the 1890s through the 1960s, the Cincinnati Milling Machine Company was one of the biggest builders of milling machines.  The company became the US's largest machine tool builder by 1926. It also built various other classes of machines, such as planers and grinding machines. In 1970, it was reincorporated as Cincinnati Milacron Inc. and later as Milacron Inc. The machine tool business line was later sold to Unova, and portions operated as Cincinnati Machine Company. An Indian subsidiary, Cincinnati Milacron Ltd, is now called Ferromatik Milacron India Pvt Ltd.

See also
Foundry Products Operations

References

Bibliography

External links
 Frederick Geier and the Cincinnati Mill
 "The Key to Rearmament". Time. November 5, 1951. quoting Frederick V. Geier
 Uniloy/Milacron
 Union Terminal Mosaics

Manufacturing companies established in 1889
History of Cincinnati
Machine tool builders
Manufacturing companies based in Cincinnati
1889 establishments in Ohio
Defunct companies based in Cincinnati